The Hotel President Wilson is located in Geneva, Switzerland, near the United Nations building on Lake Geneva.

History 
The hotel opened on May 18, 1962, as the Hotel President. In 1980, it was acquired by a joint venture between Swissair and Nestlé. In 1989, it was sold to the Tamman family. They invested 190 million CHF in its renovation and reopened it in 1996 as the Hotel President Wilson, named for the 28th president of the United States, Woodrow Wilson, in honor of his dedication to the creation of the League of Nations. On January 1, 2000, it became a member of The Luxury Collection. From 2007 to 2010, it was renovated again at a cost of 40 million CHF.

In November 2016, a Geneva hotel's computer equipment was infected by spy viruses, and sensitive talks among prominent leaders were recorded. This hotel was believed to be the Hotel President Wilson.

Most expensive hotel suites in the world 
The Royal Penthouse Suite at the Hotel President Wilson is believed to be the world's most expensive hotel suite, billed at CHF60,000 ($62,000 at mid-2017 rates) per night. The 12-bedroom suite takes up the entire eighth floor of the hotel, and has hosted heads of state from Bill Clinton to Mikhail Gorbachev. Guests can view the Swiss Alps from the suite.

In July 2017, the Hotel President Wilson ranked first in the list of most expensive suites of the world by the magazine Business Insider with its $80,000/night.

Management
 Charles Tamman, owner and chairman
 Pablo Pizarro, hotel director

References

External links
 

Hotels in Geneva
Buildings and structures in Geneva
Buildings and monuments honoring American presidents
Hotels established in 1962
Hotel buildings completed in 1962
The Luxury Collection
Economy of Geneva
20th-century architecture in Switzerland